Sattam En Kaiyil is a 1978 Indian Tamil-language action film directed by T. N. Balu starring Kamal Haasan and Sripriya. It was remade in Hindi as Yeh To Kamaal Ho Gaya (1982), with Haasan returning.

Plot 

The film revolves around twin brothers, who were separated and got different family in their childhood. One becomes an educated and a good person, while the other one becomes local city-thief and a petty criminal remaining uneducated. Problems arrive when their girlfriends think the other as their own boyfriend as they look alike. The story ends reuniting the twin brothers.

Cast 
Kamal Haasan as Babu / Rathnam
Sripriya as Priya
Miss. Elizabeth as Kathrine
Srikanth as Senthil
S. A. Ashokan as Mayandi
Thengai Srinivasan as Lawyer Nagarajan
Suruli Rajan as Rathnam's Friend
V. Gopalakrishnan as Priya's Father
Pushpalatha as Lakshmi
Ganthimathi as Sivakolunthu
Sathyaraj as Vicky
Loose Mohan
Usilai Mani

Production 
Sattam En Kaiyil is the debut film of Sathyaraj. It was the cinematographer N. K. Viswanathan who recommended him to the director T. N. Balu. Sathyaraj received a salary of ₹500.

Soundtrack 
All songs were written by Kannadasan and Thiruppathuran, and composed by Ilaiyaraaja. The song "Sorgam Madhuvile" was remixed by Karthik Raja for Maamadurai (2007).

Release 
Sattam En Kaiyil was released on 14 July 1978. It was commercially successful and ran for 100 days. 100th days celebration of the film was attended by M. Karunanidhi.

References

External links 
 

1970s Tamil-language films
1978 films
Films scored by Ilaiyaraaja
Indian action films
Tamil films remade in other languages
Twins in Indian films